Glyn Cannon is a British playwright.

His plays include; Coffee (Pleasance Edinburgh 2009), The Kiss (Hampstead Theatre) and Gone, a modern adaptation of Sophocles' Antigone that was first produced at the Pleasance Courtyard for the 2004 Edinburgh fringe festival. It won a Fringe First award from The Scotsman and transferred to the West End. Also, Nebuchadnezzar first produced in 2002 at the Latchmere theatre, Battersea, London, and On Blindness which was produced by Paines Plough, Graeae Theatre Company and Frantic Assembly (Soho Theatre, London, 2004).  He was Associate Playwright of Paines Plough, 2003–4, and is an associate artist of The Miniaturists.

Books 
 On Blindness (Methuen, February 2004)

References

External links 
 Entry in Doollee
 The Miniaturists
 Glyn Cannon website

1976 births
British dramatists and playwrights
Living people
People educated at the Royal Grammar School, High Wycombe
British male dramatists and playwrights